Chartwell is a suburb in north-eastern Hamilton, New Zealand. The suburb was named after Chartwell, the country home of Sir Winston Churchill.  The area became a part of Hamilton in June 1962 and was officially defined as a suburb in 1974. Most of the housing is private single or 2 level dwellings with little state housing. Streets near the square are used for parking. Private dwellings are being purchased by professionals to be used as business premises close to the square. The streets are well planted with trees.

Features of Chartwell

Lynden Court
Chartwell's main shopping area is located on Lynden Court. Chartwell Shopping Centre is one of Hamilton's major malls. It has a 6 cinema multiplex as well as 126 retail shops, cafes and restaurants. The Chartwell Library and the Lynden Court Mall are located on the other side of the road. Lynden Court is one of Hamilton's major transport hubs, with bus routes heading into Hamilton Central, Rototuna and the city Orbiter route.

Chartwell Park
Chartwell Park is located in between the suburbs of Chartwell and Queenwood. It features a walkway connecting these two suburbs. Chartwell Park has five football (soccer) fields. These are the home ground playing fields for St. Joseph's Catholic School's football teams.

Kumara Pit
To the northern end of Hukanui Road, there is an archaeological kumara pit. The pit is 2m deep and 8m wide in a circle shape. The pits were made by Maori who used the dug out sand and gravel to cover growing kumara plants. The sand conducted heat to make an artificial tropical climate for the kumara plants which naturally grow in Southern America. Because of the archaeological significance of these pits, the construction of the Wairere Drive/Hukanui Road intersection was made so that the pits would not be affected.

Swarbrick Landing 
Swarbrick's Landing is a small park beside the Waikato River, linked by a riverside walkway to Day's Park. It has a jetty, which is served by a ferry to the museum.

Demographics

Chartwell had a population of 5,136 at the 2018 New Zealand census, an increase of 426 people (9.0%) since the 2013 census, and an increase of 465 people (10.0%) since the 2006 census. There were 1,686 households, comprising 2,490 males and 2,646 females, giving a sex ratio of 0.94 males per female, with 1,254 people (24.4%) aged under 15 years, 1,254 (24.4%) aged 15 to 29, 1,935 (37.7%) aged 30 to 64, and 693 (13.5%) aged 65 or older.

Ethnicities were 53.9% European/Pākehā, 33.1% Māori, 9.3% Pacific peoples, 15.1% Asian, and 5.5% other ethnicities. People may identify with more than one ethnicity.

The percentage of people born overseas was 24.9, compared with 27.1% nationally.

Although some people chose not to answer the census's question about religious affiliation, 42.6% had no religion, 37.5% were Christian, 3.0% had Māori religious beliefs, 2.5% were Hindu, 4.2% were Muslim, 1.7% were Buddhist and 3.0% had other religions.

Of those at least 15 years old, 753 (19.4%) people had a bachelor's or higher degree, and 780 (20.1%) people had no formal qualifications. 378 people (9.7%) earned over $70,000 compared to 17.2% nationally. The employment status of those at least 15 was that 1,656 (42.7%) people were employed full-time, 513 (13.2%) were part-time, and 330 (8.5%) were unemployed.

Education
The school was the first to win the National Green Gold Enviro Schools Award in May 2006.

The senior years (year 11 and above) are co-educational, and the junior years are for boys. The school opened in 1959, and was single-sex boys until 1985. It is part boarding school, modelled along the lines of an English public  school. It is on the border between Chartwell and Fairfield and its fields adjoin Fairfield Intermediate.

Rolls are as of 

The nearest state secondary school is Fairfield College.

See also
List of streets in Hamilton
Suburbs of Hamilton, New Zealand

References

Suburbs of Hamilton, New Zealand
Populated places on the Waikato River